"Radio Ga Ga" is a 1984 song performed and recorded by the British rock band Queen, written by their drummer Roger Taylor. It was released as a single with "I Go Crazy" by Brian May as the B-side. It was included on the album The Works and is also featured on the band's compilation albums Greatest Hits II and Classic Queen.

The song, which makes a nostalgic defence of the radio format, was a worldwide success for the band, reaching number one in 19 countries, number two on the UK Singles Chart and the Australian Kent Music Report and number 16 on the US Billboard Hot 100, becoming the band's final single to reach the US top 20 in Freddie Mercury's lifetime. The band performed the song at every concert from 1984 to their last concert with lead singer Freddie Mercury in 1986, including their performance at Live Aid in 1985.

The music video for the song uses footage from the 1927 silent science fiction film Metropolis. It received heavy rotation on music channels and was nominated for an MTV Video Music Award in 1984.

Meaning
"Radio Ga Ga" was released in 1984. A nostalgic defence of radio, it was a commentary on television overtaking radio's popularity and how one would listen to radio in the past for a favourite comedy, drama, or science fiction programme. It also addressed the advent of the music video and MTV, which was then competing with radio as an important medium for promoting records. At the 1984 MTV Video Music Awards the video for "Radio Ga Ga" would receive a Best Art Direction nomination. Roger Taylor was quoted:

The song makes reference to two important radio events of the 20th century; Orson Welles' 1938 broadcast of H. G. Wells's The War of the Worlds in the lyric "through wars of worlds/invaded by Mars", and Winston Churchill's 18 June 1940 "This was their finest hour" speech from the House of Commons, in the lyric "You've yet to have your finest hour".

Recording

The inspiration for this song came when Roger Taylor heard his son utter the words "radio ca-ca" while listening to a bad song on the radio while they were in Los Angeles. After hearing the phrase, Taylor began writing the song when he locked himself in a room with a Roland Jupiter-8 synthesizer and a drum machine (Linn LM-1). He thought it would fit his solo album, but when the band heard it, John Deacon wrote a bassline and Freddie Mercury reconstructed the track, thinking it could be a big hit. Taylor then took a skiing holiday and let Mercury polish the lyrics, harmony, and arrangements of the song. Recording sessions began at Record Plant Studios in Los Angeles in August 1983 – the band's only time recording in North America. It included Canadian session keyboardist Fred Mandel. Mandel programmed the Jupiter's arpeggiated synth-bass parts. The recording features prominent use of the Roland VP330+ vocoder. The bassline was produced by a Roland Jupiter-8, using the built-in arpeggiator.

Track listings
7" single
A-side. "Radio Ga Ga" (Album Version)
B-side. "I Go Crazy" (Single Version)

12" single
A-side. "Radio Ga Ga" (Extended Version)
B1. "Radio Ga Ga" (Instrumental Version)
B2. "I Go Crazy" (Single Version)

Music video

David Mallet's music video for the song features scenes from Fritz Lang's 1927 German expressionist science fiction film Metropolis and also includes footage of the band traveling through Metropolis and singing the song in a stylized re-creation of its underground machine rooms, which is interconnected with people donning gas masks and taking shelter in their homes during wartime and of one such family passing the time in various ways that include listening to the radio. The video also features footage from earlier Queen promo videos. At the end of the music video, the words "Thanks To Metropolis" appear. 

The video was filmed at Carlton TV Studios and Shepperton Studios, London, between 23/24 November 1983 and January 1984. It led to a 1984 re-release of the film with a rock soundtrack. Mercury's solo song "Love Kills" was used in Giorgio Moroder's restored version of the film, and in exchange Queen were granted the rights to use footage from it in their "Radio Ga Ga" video. However, Queen had to buy performance rights to the film from the communist East German government, which was the copyright holder at the time.

Live versions
Queen finished their sets before the encores on The Works Tour with "Radio Ga Ga" and Mercury would normally sing "you had your time" in a lower octave and modify the deliveries of "you had the power, you've yet to have your finest hour" while Roger Taylor sang the pre-chorus in the high octave. Live versions from the 1984/85 tour were recorded and filmed for the concert films Queen Rock in Rio 1985 and Final Live in Japan 1985. As heard on bootleg recordings, Deacon can be heard providing backing vocals to the song; it is one of the very few occasions he sang in concert.

Queen played a shorter, up-tempo version of "Radio Ga Ga" during the Live Aid concert on 13 July 1985 at Wembley Stadium, where Queen's "show-stealing performance" had 72,000 people clapping in unison. It was the second song the band performed at Live Aid after opening with "Bohemian Rhapsody". "Radio Ga Ga" became a live favourite thanks largely to the audience participation potential of the clapping sequence prompted by the rhythm of the chorus (copied from the video). Mercury sang all high notes in this version. The song was played for the Magic Tour a year later, including twice more at Wembley Stadium; it was recorded for the live album Live at Wembley '86, VHS Video and DVD on 12 July 1986, the second night in the venue.

Paul Young performed the song with Queen at the Freddie Mercury Tribute Concert again at Wembley Stadium on 20 April 1992. At the "Party at the Palace" concert, celebrating Queen Elizabeth II's Golden Jubilee in 2002, "Radio Ga Ga" opened up Queen's set with Roger Taylor on vocals and Phil Collins on the drums.

This song was played on the Queen + Paul Rodgers Tour in 2005–2006 and sung by Roger Taylor and Paul Rodgers. It was recorded officially at the Hallam FM Arena in Sheffield on 5 May 2005. The result, Return of the Champions, was released on CD and DVD on 19 September 2005 and 17 October 2005. It was also played on the Rock the Cosmos Tour during late 2008, this time with only Rodgers on lead vocals. The concert album Live in Ukraine came as a result of this tour, yet the song is not available on the CD or DVD versions released 15 June 2009. This performance of "Radio Ga Ga" is only available as a digital download from iTunes. It was again played on the Queen + Adam Lambert Tour with Lambert on lead vocals.

Personnel

Queen
 Freddie Mercury – lead vocals, synthesizer, sampler
 Brian May – electric guitar, backing vocals
 Roger Taylor – acoustic and electronic drums, drum machine, vocoder, backing vocals, sampler, synthesizer
 John Deacon – bass guitar

Additional Personnel
 Fred Mandel – synthesizer arrangement, synthesizer programming, synthesizer
 Reinhold Mack – recording engineer
 Mike Beiriger – additional recording engineer
 Eddie DeLena – additional recording engineer
 Stefan Wissnet – additional recording engineer

Charts

Weekly charts

Year-end charts

Certifications

Influences
American pop singer Lady Gaga credits her stage name to this song. She stated that she "adored" Queen, and that they had a hit called 'Radio Ga Ga'. "That's why I love the name".

See also
List of Dutch Top 40 number-one singles of 1984
List of European number-one hits of 1984
List of number-one singles of 1984 (Ireland)
List of number-one singles and albums in Sweden

References

External links
Official YouTube videos: original music video, Big Spender/ Radio Ga Ga (Live At Wembley), Queen + Paul Rodgers, at Freddie Mercury Tribute Concert
Lyrics from Queen official site: lyrics from Live Magic version, lyrics from Live at Wembley '86 version.
Radio Ga Ga performed by Prisoners in the Cebu Provincial Detention and Rehabilitational Centre

1984 songs
1984 singles
British pop rock songs
British synth-pop songs
Capitol Records singles
Dutch Top 40 number-one singles
EMI Records singles
European Hot 100 Singles number-one singles
Hollywood Records singles
Irish Singles Chart number-one singles
Number-one singles in Finland
Number-one singles in Poland
Number-one singles in Sweden
Queen (band) songs
Song recordings produced by Reinhold Mack
Songs about radio
Songs written by Roger Taylor (Queen drummer)
Ultratop 50 Singles (Flanders) number-one singles
Music videos directed by David Mallet (director)
Works based on Metropolis (1927 film)